Welsford is a small farming community in the Canadian province of Nova Scotia, located in Kings County. 

It is one of two communities in Nova Scotia named after Augustus Frederick Welsford, a Nova Scotian war hero in the Crimean War, the other being Welsford, Pictou County (see the Welsford-Parker Monument). Nestled at the base of Nova Scotia's North Mountain, Welsford stretches along Route 221. Welsford is the birthplace of the entrepreneur Alfred Fuller, the "Fuller Brush Man".

References

  Welsford on Destination Nova Scotia

Communities in Kings County, Nova Scotia
General Service Areas in Nova Scotia